Maengjungri station is a railway station in Maengjung-rodongjagu, Pakch'ŏn County, North P'yŏngan Province, North Korea. It is on located on the P'yŏngŭi Line of the Korean State Railway. It is the starting point of the Namhŭng Line, which leads to the important Namhŭng Youth Chemical Complex in Namhŭng. It is also the junction point between the P'yŏngŭi Line and the Pakch'ŏn Line.

History
The station was opened by the Chosen Government Railway on 1 October 1914.

References

Railway stations in North Korea